Vėliučionys is a village located in Vilnius District Municipality, 5 kilometers east of Vilnius city municipality, the capital of Lithuania. According to the census of 2001, the village has a population of 581.

History 
During World War II, on September 20–22, 1941, 1159 Jews from local shtetls are murdered in mass executions perpetrated by an Einsatzgruppen.

References 

Villages in Vilnius County
Holocaust locations in Lithuania